Elections to Kingston upon Thames Council were held on 7 May 1998. The whole council was up for election and the Liberal Democrats lost overall control of the council to a Conservative led minority administration.

Election result

Ward results

References

1998
1998 London Borough council elections